The 1979 Findlay Oilers football team was an American football team that represented the University of Findlay as a member of the Hoosier–Buckeye Conference during the 1979 NAIA Division II football season.

Schedule

References

Findlay Oilers
Findlay Oilers football seasons
NAIA Football National Champions
Findlay Oilers football